Gentiana utriculosa is a species of flowering plant belonging to the family Gentianaceae.

Its native range is Europe's mountains.

References

utriculosa